UDR Inc. (formerly United Dominion Realty) is a publicly traded real estate investment trust that invests in apartments. The company is organized in Maryland with its headquarters in Highlands Ranch, Colorado. As of December 31, 2020, the company owned interests in 149 apartment communities containing 48,283 apartment units.

It is the 19th largest owner of apartments in the United States and the 30th largest apartment property manager in the United States.

History
The company was founded in Highlands Ranch, Colorado in 1972. It became a public company via an initial public offering in January 1978. It was added to the S&P 500 in March 2016.

References

External links

1970s initial public offerings
1972 establishments in Colorado
Companies based in Colorado
Douglas County, Colorado
Real estate companies established in 1972
Companies listed on the New York Stock Exchange
Real estate investment trusts of the United States